The 2014 Liberty Flames football team represented Liberty University in the 2014 NCAA Division I FCS football season. They were led by third-year head coach Turner Gill and played their home games at Williams Stadium. They were a member of the Big South Conference. They finished the season 9–4, 4–1 in Big South play to share the conference championship with Coastal Carolina. They received the Big South's automatic bid to the FCS Playoffs where they defeated James Madison in the first round before losing in the second round to Villanova.

Schedule

Source: Schedule

Game summaries

@ North Carolina

In their first game of the season, the Flames lost, 56–29 to the North Carolina Tar Heels.

@ Norfolk State

In their second game of the season, the Flames won, 17–0 over the Norfolk State Spartans.

Brevard

In their third game of the season, the Flames won, 56–31 over the Brevard Tornadoes.

Bryant

In their fourth game of the season, the Flames won, 38–21 over the Bryant Bulldogs.

@ Indiana State

In their fifth game of the season, the Flames lost, 38–19 to the Indiana State Sycamores.

Richmond

In their sixth game of the season, the Flames lost, 46–39, in double overtime, to the Richmond Spiders.

@ Appalachian State

In their seventh game of the season, the Flames won, 55–48, in overtime, over the Appalachian State Mountaineers.

Gardner–Webb

In their eighth game of the season, the Flames won, 34–0, over the Gardner–Webb Runnin' Bulldogs.

@ Presbyterian

In their ninth game of the season, the Flames won, 28–7, over the Presbyterian Blue Hose.

Monmouth

In their tenth game of the season, the Flames won, 34–24, over the Monmouth Hawks.

Charleston Southern

In their eleventh game of the season, the Flames lost, 38–36, to the Charleston Southern Buccaneers.

@ Coastal Carolina

In their twelfth game of the season, the Flames won, 15–14, over the Coastal Carolina Chanticleers.

FCS Playoffs

@ James Madison

In their thirteenth game of the season, the Flames won, 26–21, over the James Madison Dukes in their 2014 FCS First Round playoff game.

@ Villanova

In their fourteenth game of the season, the Flames lost, 29–22, to the Villanova Wildcats in their 2014 FCS Second Round playoff game.

Ranking movements

References

Liberty
Liberty Flames football seasons
Big South Conference football champion seasons
Liberty
Liberty Flames football